Alexis Meva (born 9 September 1997) is a Cameroonian footballer who currently plays for Pobla Mafumet as a winger.

Career
Meva joined United Soccer League side Portland Timbers 2 on February 22, 2016.

References

External links
Timbers 2 Profile

1997 births
Living people
Cameroonian footballers
Association football wingers
Cameroonian expatriate footballers
Portland Timbers 2 players
Tercera División players
CD Castellón footballers
Cameroonian expatriate sportspeople in Spain
Cameroonian expatriate sportspeople in the United States
Expatriate footballers in Spain
Expatriate soccer players in the United States
USL Championship players
Footballers from Douala
FC La Chaux-de-Fonds players